Callum Moore is the name of:

Callum Moore (Australian footballer), AFL player for Richmond
Callum Moore (Scottish footballer), association football player for Dundee